Wain is a surname. Notable people with the surname include:

Bea Wain (1917–2017), American Big Band-era singer
David Wain (born 1969), American comedian, writer, actor and director
Edward Wain, aka Robert Towne (born 1934), American screenwriter and director
John Wain (1925–1994), English poet, novelist, and critic, associated with the literary group "The Movement"
Louis Wain (1860–1939), English artist known for his drawings featuring anthropomorphised large-eyed cats and kittens
Louise Wain, English respiratory researcher
Richard William Leslie Wain (1896–1917), Welsh recipient of the Victoria Cross
William Wain Prior (1876–1946), Commander-in-Chief of the Royal Danish Army, 1939–1941

See also
Charles' Wain
Burmeister & Wain
Waine Pryce
Lis Wain Danish folklore Fearless Female Warrior with curls of red and eyes of green